Chhaa Jaa (Go Forth and Shine) is a digital-first youth brand in India that aims to help girls build the confidence they need to make choices and changes in their lives.

History 
Chhaa Jaa was created by the international non-profit organization Girl Effect in 2019 under the management of Jessica Posner Odede (CEO).

Chhaa Jaa provides media driven offerings, tailor-made for adolescent girls and young women. From seeking information about their bodies and the services around them to negotiating educational options or contraception usage.

Digital Media Content 
Chhaa Jaa's digital content aims to reflect girls' choices as teenagers using entertaining, informative and authentic storylines on social media platforms. This includes short videos covering various topics that are relevant to girls, like sexual and reproductive health, negotiating with parents about choices for their education, etc.

In June 2019 Chhaa Jaa's digital media series launched, Arre Sunn Na (Please listen) that uses sketch comedy to tell the story of Sweety and Tannu, who share messages about girls' lives and stories.  In July 2019, they launched another informative video series called Khullam Khulla (Open talks), which addresses shame and stigma around sexual health knowledge through a relatable role model. In September 2019, Tumhari Meri Baatein  (Stories about you and me) series was started. The series features the story of a girl, Rani, who busts myths adolescents commonly have around sexual and reproductive health.

Chatbot 
In 2020, Chhaa Jaa launched Bol Behen (Speak! Sister), a chatbot available in Hinglish designed for girls living in India's Hindi belt.   A “digital elder sister”, Bol Behen creates a safe space for girls to pose questions about sensitive topics like sex, relationships and reproductive health, and receive non-judgemental answers, enhancing their knowledge about these topics.

In addition to delivering messages on the significance of health-seeking behaviors in engaging and entertaining ways, Bol Behen also aims to foster girls’ intentions and efforts towards accessing health services.

Bol Behen chatbot was launched on Facebook Messenger in June 2021. Since then, it has received 1.6 million messages and held over 100,000 conversations to March 2022. In 2022, it expanded to WhatsApp, in order to help accommodate its target audience's varying levels of digital access.

Community 
Chhaa Jaa created the girls-only, Facebook community Bak Bak Gang in August, 2019. A closed and moderated social media "safe space", Bak Bak Gang enables girls to support each other, have open and non-judgemental conversations about life, love, sex and their bodies and discuss themes from Chhaa Jaa's content.

The group has over 3,400 members as of April 2022.

Recognitions 
UNESCO, UNICEF, WHO, HRP and UNFPA commissioned Chhaa Jaa to serve as a best practice case study for a model for youth-centred digital health interventions released in 2020.
Digital media series Khullam Khulla won an India Content Leadership Award’ 2020 for 'Best Content in a Digital Media Campaign for a Cause'.

See also
Girl Effect

References

External links

Women's education in India